Ribulose is a ketopentose — a monosaccharide containing five carbon atoms, and including a ketone functional group.  It has chemical formula . Two enantiomers are possible, -ribulose (-erythro-pentulose) and -ribulose (-erythro-pentulose). -Ribulose is the diastereomer of -xylulose.

Ribulose sugars are composed in the pentose phosphate pathway from arabinose.  They are important in the formation of many bioactive substances.  For example, -ribulose is an intermediate in the fungal pathway for -arabitol production.  Also, as the 1,5-bisphosphate, -ribulose combines with carbon dioxide at the start of the photosynthesis process in green plants (carbon dioxide trap).

Ribulose has the same stereochemistry at carbons 3 and 4 as the five-carbon aldoses ribose and arabinose.

References

Ketopentoses